De Spectaculis, also known as On the Spectacles or The Shows, is a surviving moral and ascetic treatise by Tertullian. Written somewhere between 197 and 202, the work looks at the moral legitimacy and consequences of Christians attending the circus, theatre, or amphitheatre.

Tertullian argues that human enjoyment can be an offence to God. His view of these public entertainments is that they are a misuse of God's creation and a perversion of the gifts God has given to man. He supports his claim by reminding the reader that these shows and spectacles derived from pagan ritual rites (the Liberalia, the Consualia, the Equiria, the Bacchanalia, etc.). This means that the events derive from idolatry. Of key concern was that the "show always leads to spiritual agitation". By attending and partaking in the event, man is subject to strong excitements, which are aroused due to natural lapses, which create passionate desire.  Additionally, Tertullian writes that that which is not permissible to say or do should not be permissible to see or hear.

Friedrich Nietzsche, in On the Genealogy of Morality (Essay 1, Section 15), uses Tertullian's words to highlight the resemblance of Christian worship to circus-going: "In place of athletes, we have our martyrs; if we crave blood, we have the blood of Christ..." To those addicted to the pleasure of pagan spectacles Tertullian tried to show that Christianity offers far superior spectacles. For this reason he spoke of the Second Coming, the resurrection of the saints, New Jerusalem, and of “what no eye has seen, nor ear heard, nor the human heart conceived”, but the spectacle on which he enlarged most was the Last Judgement and the ensuing punishment of the enemies of Christ:

Such an expression of joy over the ruin of the damned finds no match in the other works of early Christians. However, it must be taken into account that in an earlier chapter of the treatise Tertullian wrote that “the innocent can find no pleasure in another’s sufferings: he rather mourns that a brother has sinned so heinously as to need a punishment so dreadful.” This passage is hard--if not impossible--to reconcile with the one quoted before and it is therefore debatable what Tertullian's real sentiments regarding the damned were.

References

External links

De spectaculis: Latin text with English translation by Terrot Reaveley Glover, Loeb Classical Library 1931
De spectaculis at the Tertullian Project, including links to text and translations

2nd-century Latin books
3rd-century Latin books
Essays about culture
Philosophy essays
Ethics books
Gladiatorial combat
Works by Tertullian
Christianity in the Roman Empire